The Water Tower in Hellevoetsluis was designed by architect N. Biezeveld and was built in 1896.

The water tower is 22 meters high and has two water reservoirs of each 60 m³.

History
It took many years before Hellevoetsluis got a water pipe. Before that time, the navy had a so called watership in operation, with which they fetched water from the Meuse. The navy didn't like this way of getting water anymore and thus the schout-bij-nacht threatened that the navy would leave the city, if there wouldn't be a water pipe quickly. This threat helped and the water tower was built in 1896. The water tower was taken into operation on 31 August 1896. Because of this, Hellevoetsluis was the first municipality on the island of Voorne-Putten with a water pipe.

In 1965, the water tower was decommissioned and sold for a symbolic sum of 1 Dutch guilder.

References

Water towers in the Netherlands
Towers in South Holland
Buildings and structures in Voorne aan Zee
Towers completed in 1896